Autumn Winds is the debut studio album by Tina Guo. It was released on May 17, 2011. The album features composers from Johann Sebastian Bach, Jules Massenet, Lu-Yan Guo, Gabriel Fauré, Thomas DiCandia and Nikolai Rimsky-Korsakov.

Track listing
I Lost My Love in the Wind 6:10
Air 5:08
Melody (Elegy) 2:20
Ice Lake 3:20
The Peace Variations 2:47
Jesu, Joy of Man's Desiring 3:44
Meditation from Thais 5:37
Apres un reve 3:29
A Song With No Words 6:23
(The Tragedy Of) The Bumble-Bee 1:41

Release history

References

External links
 Tina Guo – Autumn Winds
Autumn Winds
Autumn Winds Tina Guo

2011 debut albums
Tina Guo albums
Neoclassical albums
New-age albums